The Triumph of Hercules, the 1964 film, was one of many Italian sword and sandal epics during the 1960s craze. Originally titled Il Trionfo di Ercole, the film was directed by Alberto De Martino. Hercules was portrayed by Dan Vadis.
The film was released internationally as Hercules vs the Giant Warriors, and also as Hercules and the Ten Avengers.

Plot
Hercules is called upon to fight seven golden giants summoned by the Dagger of Jae, sister of Juno (Hera), who dislikes Hercules "for certain family reasons." Hercules also fights to protect his princess love, but matters are complicated by her evil relative Milo, who has murdered her father the king but has tricked her into thinking it was someone else because she trusts him too much. Milo tricks Hercules into killing his friend, for which he is punished by his father Jove (Jupiter/Zeus) who takes away his enormous strength, because he has misused it. Milo is conspiring with his sorceress mother to take the throne for himself.

Now only as strong as a mortal man, Hercules is overpowered when he tries to rescue the princess Ate (pronounced Ah-tay) from Milo and is then accused of being a fraud. Milo tries to kill both Hercules and Ate by chaining them to a giant wooden lever with spikes, complete with a cage over Hercules which he must support while rocks are piled on him: if he can hold it up, then he will prove himself the true Hercules (which he is) but if not, then he will be guilty and he and Ate will die together for conspiring to steal the throne and give it to an imposter.

As the weight of the stones and rocks drive the de-powered Hercules to his knees, he sincerely begs his father Jove to let him die if it is his destiny but to spare Ate who is innocent. Jove resolves this by restoring Hercules's demi-god strength, allowing him to overpower the soldiers, save Ate, and thwart Milo along with his seven golden giants and evil mother. The two bumbling thieves also prove useful in the climax.

In the end, Hercules marries Ate and becomes king of her city.

Cast
Dan Vadis as Hercules
Marilù Tolo as Princess Ate
Pierre Cressoy as Prince Milo
Moira Orfei as the Sorceress Pasiphae
Annamaria Mustari as Hera/Juno
Nazzareno Zamperla as Thief

Production
Marilu Tolo was given tinted lenses to play a malicious doppelgänger Hercules' love interest Princess Ate.

Biography

References

External links 
 

1964 films
1960s fantasy adventure films
Italian fantasy adventure films
Peplum films
1960s Italian-language films
Films directed by Alberto De Martino
Films set in ancient Greece
Films about Heracles
Films scored by Francesco De Masi
Sword and sandal films
1960s Italian films